= Issen gorin =

Japanese WWII term

Issen gorin（Japanese: 一銭五厘, hiragana: いっせんごりん）which translated means "penny postcard" is a term associated with a value placed upon draftees in the Imperial Japanese Army in the Pacific theatre of World War II. This term roughly meant that the individual was only worth the amount on the letter to draft them.

More specifically, "issen gorin" translates to "one sen, five rin", the cost of mailing a draft notice postcard (less than an American penny). The name issen gorin was the name Japanese officers and powerful military personnel used to refer to the average Japanese soldier, meaning that the individuals responsible for the wellbeing of the Japanese soldiers viewed the soldiers as being worth less than a penny. In their training and subsequent treatment during World War II, Japanese soldiers were constantly reminded by their superiors that their value was that of issen gorin - effectively worthless.
